Mike Maser (March 2, 1947 – July 14, 2019) was an American football offensive line coach for the Miami Dolphins of the National Football League in 2008. He previously served in the same capacity for the Carolina Panthers from 2003 to 2006 and the Jacksonville Jaguars from 1995 to 2002. He had over three decades of college and pro coaching experience.

Born in Plattsburgh, New York, Maser died July 14, 2019 in Charlotte, NC.

Coaching History
1973 Marshall University (GA)
1974-1978 Bluefield State College (OL)
1979-1980 University of Maine (OL)
1981-1993 Boston College (OL)
1995-2002 Jacksonville Jaguars (OL)
2003-2006 Carolina Panthers (OL)
2008 Miami Dolphins (OL)

References

1947 births
2019 deaths
People from Clayton, New York
American football offensive guards
Buffalo Bulls football players
Marshall University alumni
Buffalo Bulls football coaches
Marshall Thundering Herd football coaches
Maine Black Bears football coaches
Boston College Eagles football coaches
Jacksonville Jaguars coaches
Carolina Panthers coaches
Miami Dolphins coaches
Coaches of American football from New York (state)
Players of American football from New York (state)